This is the first edition of the event. Sam Groth won the title, defeating Luke Saville in the final, 7–5, 6–1.

Seeds

Draw

Finals

Top half

Bottom half

References
 Main Draw
 Qualifying Draw

Aegon Manchester Trophy - Singles
2015 Singles